VVT may refer to:

 Valvettithurai, a town in Sri Lanka
 Variable valve timing, an internal combustion engine valvetrain configuration
 VVT (gang), a gang in Toronto, Canada